Datin Wira Poppy Capella Swastika (born 22 October 1991) (née Lim), often styled as Madame Poppy Capella, is an Indonesian pageant director, singer, songwriter, actress and businesswoman. She grew up in Singapore and moved back to Indonesia, where she became a singer and actress.

Capella was the current national director of the Miss Universe Indonesia and Miss Universe Malaysia, under the PT. Capella Swastika Karya (Just Capella Sdn.Bhd.) organization. She also has served as chairman of both country.

Early life
Capella was born in Surabaya, East Java, Indonesia to a Catholic parents; Ryo Capello Tan Hok-Sie, from Surabaya and Isabella Ongkowidjaja, from Denpasar. She moved to Singapore in 1997 together with her family. She is the eldest sibling of two younger sisters, Capella is the niece of an Indonesian actress and singer Inul Daratista. Initially, her father, working as an interior-architect decided to take her to Singapore on a promise of temporary vacation. As a young student, Capella finished her study at Cedar Girls' Secondary School in Singapore, and later found her interest in acting and singing Indonesian folk music Dangdut.

After high school, Capella enrolled in Yong Siew Toh Conservatory of Music of National University of Singapore, Singapore to continue her BMus. Bachelor of Music (Honours) in Music and Society. In 2012, she gained a popularity after releasing her first single named "Bukan Seperti Film", "Honey Bunny" and a duo collaboration with Ayu Ting Ting in "Ta..Ti..Tut" directed by her aunt Inul Daratista. In 2019, Capella married Datuk Wira Justin Lim Hwa-Tat, a prominent Malaysian political figure and businessman at the St Andrew's Cathedral, Singapore, thereby sharing in two children. Capella and her husband are well-experienced in various fields such as Shipping, Commodities, Structured Financing, Fund Raising, Aviation and Trading Sectors.

Miss Universe Indonesia and Malaysia 
On 8 February 2023, a new Miss Universe Indonesia organization was formed under the same ownership with Miss Universe Malaysia. The license is owned by Capella, which is also the national director of the pageant under PT. Capella Swastika Karya and Just Capella Sdn. Bhd. management. The press launch of the pageants was attended by the Miss Universe 2022 R'Bonney Gabriel, 2nd runner-up and top 5 of Miss Universe 2022, Andreína Martínez and Gabriëla Dos Santos, respectively.

Discography
Capella is also a singer songwriter, who has released several singles since 2012, she was debuted under her own aunt Inul Daratista management.

Music videos

See also
Miss Universe Indonesia
Miss Universe Malaysia

References 

1991 births
Living people
Poppy Capella
Poppy Capella
20th-century businesswomen
Indonesian female models
Indonesian Christians
Indonesian television actresses
21st-century Indonesian actresses
21st-century Indonesian women singers
People from Surabaya